The Alabama–Georgia Tech football rivalry is an American college football rivalry between the Alabama Crimson Tide football team of the University of Alabama and Georgia Tech Yellow Jackets football team of the Georgia Institute of Technology. Dormant since 1984, the series is set to be renewed in 2030 and 2031.

Notable games

Game results

See also 
 List of NCAA college football rivalry games

References 

College football rivalries in the United States